Kello Hospital is a health facility in John's Loan, Biggar, South Lanarkshire, Scotland. It is managed by NHS Lanarkshire.

History
The facility, which was financed by a legacy from Simon Linton Kello, a local bank manager, and his sister, was completed in November 1926. It was expanded in 1937 and, after joining the National Health Service in 1948, it was extended again in 1967. A significant number of patients were transferred from Lockart Hospital when that hospital was unable to recruit any clinical staff in 2016.

References

1926 establishments in Scotland
Hospitals established in 1926
Hospital buildings completed in 1926
NHS Scotland hospitals
Hospitals in South Lanarkshire
NHS Lanarkshire